Gustaf Malcolm "Gösta" Lilliehöök (25 May 1884 – 18 November 1974) was a Swedish officer and modern pentathlete. He won a gold medal in the first contested modern pentathlon at the Olympic Games in 1912.

Career
Lilliehöök was born on 25 May 1884 in Stockholm, Sweden, the son of First Marshal of the Court Carl Malcolm Lilliehöök and his wife Anna Ekelund. He was commissioned as an officer in Svea Artillery Regiment in 1906 with the rank of underlöjtnant. Lilliehöök was promoted to  lieutenant in 1910 and to captain in 1918 after which he was placed in the reserve.

He won a gold medal in the first contested modern pentathlon at the Olympic Games in 1912. He later became one of the first five employees of the national Swedish radio.

Personal life
In 1922, Lilliehöök married Anna de Fine Blauw (born 1891), the daughter of the artist Dick Blauw and Marie de Fine Beyer.

References

External links

 Gösta Lilliehöök at sports-reference.com

1884 births
1974 deaths
Swedish Army officers
Swedish male modern pentathletes
Modern pentathletes at the 1912 Summer Olympics
Olympic modern pentathletes of Sweden
Olympic gold medalists for Sweden
Olympic medalists in modern pentathlon
Sportspeople from Stockholm
Medalists at the 1912 Summer Olympics